Nižná Myšľa is a village and municipality in Košice-okolie District in the Kosice Region of eastern Slovakia.

History
In historical records, the village was first mentioned in 1270.

Geography
It has a population of about 1400 people.

References

External links
Municipal website 
Museum in Nižná Myšľa 
Information about Nižná Myšľa for tourists 
Article about the excavations in Nižná Myšľa

Villages and municipalities in Košice-okolie District
Archaeological sites in Slovakia